Jeongja-dong is a group of three administrative neighbourhoods of Jangan-gu, Suwon, Gyeonggi-do, South Korea. Jeongja-dong (정자동/) is also a legal status neighbourhood, though the administrative neighbourhoods' boundaries are wider. The three administrative neighbourhoods comprising Jeongja-dong are Jeongja-1-dong, Jeongja-2-dong, and Jeongja-3-dong. Jeongja-3-dong incorporates part of the legal status neighbourhood Cheoncheon-dong. Jeongja-dong is in central Jangan-gu, though it shares a short border with the city of Uiwang.

History 

Jeongja (정자/) means pavilion, and it is thought that the name comes from local pavilions such as Yeongyeongjeong (영영정/) (also known as Gyogujeong [교구정/]). Jeongja-dong was originally in Ilyong-myeon, Gwangju-bu (광주부 일용면), and was incorporated into Suwon-bu (수원부) in 1789 as Jeongja-ri according to the Suwon Gazette (Suwon-gun Eupji), published in 1899.

On April 1, 1914, when the name and administrative district were changed by the colonial Japanese, Jinmok-dong and Cheoncheon-dong were renamed Cheoncheon-ri, and fell under the jurisdiction of Ilhyeong-myeon. On October 1, 1936, Ilhyeong-myeon and Uiwang-myeon were merged into Ilwang-myeon, and Cheoncheon-ri became Jeongjeong-ri.

After liberation, on August 15, 1949, when the Suwon-eup area was promoted to Suwon-bu (Suwon City), the area was reorganised into Jeongja-ri, Ilwang-myeon, and Hwaseong-gun. On January 1, 1963, by Law No. 1175, it was incorporated into Suwon City from Ilwang-myeon, Hwaseong-gun. At this time, it fell under the jurisdiction of Pajeong-dong, along with Pajeong-ri, Imok-ri, and Yuljeon-ri. According to Suwon City Ordinance No. 1139, on October 1, 1983, Pajeong-dong was separated into Pajeong-dong and Jeongja-dong. On January 1, 1990, according to Suwon City Ordinance No. 1607, it was divided into Jeongja 1-dong and Jeongja 2-dong.  On December 31, 1997, when apartments were built in the Jeongja district, the population surged, and on February 10, 2003, Jeongja 1-dong and Jeongja 3-dong were separated.

In 1987, SKC opened a chemical factory in Jeongja-1-dong. This has contributed significantly to Suwon's tax revenue. The area is today, however, becoming more residential, and the factory is the cause of the greatest number of complaints from Suwon residents.

Geography 

The Seohocheon stream flows SSE through Jeongja-dong. Its source is on the south west slopes below Gwanggyo Helipad on the nearby mountain Gwanggyosan, and this stream joins the Hwanggujicheon further south, by Suwon Air Base. The Seohocheon is joined in Jeongja-dong by the Jeongjacheon (also sometimes known as the Yeonghwacheon), which flows SSW from Ilwang Reservoir in Manseok Park.

Industry 

Jeongja-dong contains an SKC chemical plant producing window film. The plant was reduced in size to create the 3,498-unit 117.7m-tall SK Sky View apartment complex, which opened in 2013.

Education 

Jeongja-dong has nine elementary schools: Cheoncheon, Cheonil, Daepyeong, Dasol, Dongsin, Hyocheon, Jeongja, Myeongin, and Songnim. There are three middle schools: Cheoncheon, Daepyeong and Myeongin. Cheoncheon, Daepyeong, Gyeonggi Sports High School, Suseong, Jangan, and Yeongsaeng High Schools are also in Jeongja-dong, as is Dongnam Health University.

Housing 

Apartment complexes in Jeongja-dong include:
Byeoksan Blooming
Cheongsol Village (Halla, SK Hanhwa)
Daedong
Dongsin (Complexes 1 & 2)
Dongyang Gosok Seongji
Dugyeon Village (Byeoksan, KT e-Pyeonhan Sesang)
Halla Vivaldi
Hanguk
Hwaseo Station Park Prugio
Hyundai Byeoksan
Hyundai Kolon
Ilseong
Jugong Deuranche
Saemnae Village (Hyundai, Samho, Sinan)
Samhwan Nauville
Silk Village (Best Town, Hyundai, Ubang, Yeongpung)
Sinan
Sinmyeong Sky View
SK Sky View (opened May 2013, highest apartments in Suwon till 2015)
Yeonkkot Village (Byeoksan, Pungnim)

The neighbourhood of houses immediately east of SK Sky View Apartments has been cleared for construction of GS North Suwon Xi Apartments, which are due to open in March 2024.

Facilities 
Jeongja-dong has a major sports centre—Life Sports—with multiple swimming pools, a gym, and other leisure facilities, e.g., a sauna. There are also a trampoline centre (Jumping Park) and a roller skating centre (Roller Park), both for children.

The 1250-seat performing arts centre Suwon SK Artrium opened in 2014 beside SK Sky View Apartments in northern Jeongja-1-dong. Starfield, a large entertainment, dining, and shopping mall, is under construction in southern Jeongja-2-dong, and is expected to open by early 2024.

Suwon Central Police Station, Suwon Fire Station, and the main Suwon Post Office are all in Jeongja-3-dong.

Shopping facilities are centred around two main parts of Jeongja-3-dong: near the fire station, and by the railway between Sungkyunkwan University and Hwaseo Stations, where there is a branch of Lotte Mart.

Transport

Rail 

The Gyeongbu Railway Line passes briefly through Jeongja-dong between Sungkyunkwan University and Hwaseo Stations on Seoul Subway Line 1, though there are no stations actually in Jeongja-dong. Since several Korean cities have a  Jeongja-dong, some confusion can arise, especially regarding transport. Travellers should thus be aware that Jeongja Station is in Jeongja-dong in the nearby city of Seongnam, not in Suwon.

Road 

No major roads pass through the area, but National Route 1 lies just outside its boundaries, and the North Suwon Interchange on the Yeongdong Expressway is nearby.

Religion 
The Roman Catholic diocese of Suwon, incorporating much of southern Gyeonggi-do, was established on October 7, 1963. Its headquarters are in Jeongja-dong at 39 Imok-ro.

References 

Neighbourhoods in Suwon